Camponotus compressus is a type of ground-nesting species of ant found in India and Southeast Asia. It is a frequent visitor to toilets as it consumes urea. It is one of the many species which tends plant-sap-sucking insects like aphids and tree hoppers. They add nutrients into the soil through their discarded waste piles   These ants stroke their antenna on the hind parts of these insects stimulating them to excrete a sugar rich liquid, called honeydew, which the ants consume. In return, they are known to protect the insects from predators like ladybugs.

References

External links

compressus
Hymenoptera of Asia
Insects described in 1787